Ken Hicks (born July 18, 1947) is a Canadian former professional ice hockey player. He was selected by the Oakland Seals in the 1st round (3rd overall) of the 1967 NHL Amateur Draft, but never played in the National Hockey League. Ken Hicks played in a total of five leagues over the course of his career.

Career Statistics

Regular season and playoffs

References
 

1947 births
Living people
Brandon Wheat Kings players
Canadian ice hockey forwards
Charlotte Checkers (EHL) players
National Hockey League first-round draft picks
Oakland Seals draft picks